The 1952–53 season was the 60th season in Liverpool F.C.'s existence, and the club finished seventeenth in the table. Liverpool were knocked out by Gateshead F.C. in the FA Cup.

Goalkeepers

 Charlie Ashcroft
 Russell Crossley

Defenders

 Hugh Gerhardi
 John Heydon
 Laurie Hughes
 Bill Jones
 Ray Lambert
 Joseph Maloney
 Ronnie Moran
 Bob Paisley
 Steve Parr
 Eddie Spicer
 Phil Taylor
 George Whitworth

Midfielders

 Alan A'Court
 Ken Brierley
 Brian Jackson
 Billy Liddell
 Jimmy Payne
 Roy Saunders
 Jack Smith
 Bryan Williams

Forwards

 Eric Anderson
 Kevin Baron
 Louis Bimpson
 Mervyn Jones
 Arthur Rowley
 Sammy Smyth
 Albert Stubbins

Table

Results

First Division

FA Cup

References
 LFC History.net – 1952–53 season
 Liverweb - 1952–53 Season

Liverpool F.C. seasons
Liverpool